The Yeonan Yi clan is one of the Korean clans. Their Bon-gwan is in Yeonan County, North Korea. According to the census held in 2015, the number of Yeonan Yi clan’s member was 164,036. It is did that around 660, he became a general during the Tang dynasty who came to Silla and eventually went to bring down Baekje.  founded Yi clan of Yeonan after he was naturalized in Silla.

See also 
 Korean clan names of foreign origin

References

External links